The Indian Pentecostal Church of God (IPC) is  one of the largest Pentecostal Christian Denomination in India, with over 10,000 congregations worldwide. Its organisational headquarters located in Kumbanad, Kerala, India. IPC has similarities with the Kerala Brethren denomination in terms of its beliefs on orthodoxy and eschatology, as a large portion of IPC's founders and early members were from the Kerala Brethren. IPC shares its beliefs with similar churches such as Assemblies of God and Sharon Fellowship Church. However, it distances itself from legalistic denominations such as The Pentecostal Mission. IPC tends to shy away from ecumenism, and some of its leaders reject high church liturgy as a method of worship, instead opting for low church congregational worship.

History

Origins (Early 20th Century)

Protestant evangelical low church movement flourished in Kerala after the translation of the Bible by Hermann Gundert and Benjamin Bailey who also established the first printing press in Kerala in mid 1800s. George Burg, an American-German missionary first introduced the Pentecostal experience in early 1900s. During those times, many evangelical low churches were from the Kerala Brethren and followed reformed puritan practises (Verubadh Sabha) and these churches was pioneered by K.V. Simon, Volbrecht Nagel, Anthony Norris Groves etc. The origins of the Indian Pentecostal Church can be traced back to K E Abraham, who belonged to the Kerala Brethren denomination during the period of the native revival movement in Travancore. Abraham was born on March I, 1899 to Jacobite parents in Mulakuzha, India.  He left Jacobite church at young age and was rebaptized on February 27, 1916 by Brethren minister and theologian Mahakavi K.V. Simon. During his younger years, Abraham ministered among the youth, and as a result, many people accepted Christianity. As a Christian minister, he had built a small place of worship adjacent to his house in Mulakuzha in 1920 for a Puritan Assembly.

The missionaries from the west also came at the same time to South India for the propagation of the Pentecostal doctrine. Many native people accepted it. On 22 June 1923, it was alleged that Abraham also received the gift of speaking in tongues and became a Pentecostal believer at the house of C. Manasseh at Paraniyam at Neyyattinkara. Because he accepted the Pentecostal faith, the Puritans did not accept him.

During the time of rejection and separation from his erst while group, he wrote a book, Baptism of the Holy Spirit advocating a second baptism, baptism by the Holy Spirit strongly in line with Wesleyan Christian Perfection which made a way for him to be known; it opened many ways to preach and to propagate the Pentecostal message. Several prayer groups and fellowships sprang up in Travencore.

Following that, more churches were established and subsequently on 13 April 1924 a monthly gathering was started with all these churches, which is still continuing among all the IPC churches in different places.  These independent movement churches were given a name in July 1924 ‘Thennindia Pentecosthu Daivasabha’ (The South India Pentecostal Church of God). Even when Abraham and colleagues formed these independent churches, they were in cooperation with Rev. Robert F. Cook who headed "Thennindia Poorna Suvishesha Daivasabha" and Mary Chapman the Assemblies of God missionary.

There was a dispute on a ‘land registration’ with Assemblies of God, which caused Abraham to disconnect his relationship with the AG church for a while, at least until the return of Rev. Robert F. Cook from America. When Cook returned Pastor K.E Abraham along with Rev. Cook formed a new organization called Malankara Pentecost Daivasabha by merging the "Thennindia Pentecosthu Daivasabha" (K E Abraham) and "Thennindia Poorna Suvishesha Daivasabha" (Robert F. Cook). These churches had affiliation from Assemblies God as an independent denomination. However, Malankara Pentecosthu Daivasabha was a native movement under the leadership of Cook and K E Abraham. The joint venture helped the church grow faster and many accepted the new faith.

Even though Thennindia Pentecosthu Daivasabha and Thennindia Poorna Suvishesha Daivasabha merged, the churches that were under the jurisdiction of Abraham kept an independent nature. Even though the two organizations merged there was a separate meeting of the Thennindia Pentecosthu Daivasabha held at the house of Abraham on 9 April 1927.

In 1929, the Malankara Pentecost Daivasabha completely separated from the fellowship of AG due to their restriction concerning the ministerial areas for the work of the missionaries. It was not acceptable to Abraham and other native ministers; therefore, they encouraged Cook to detach Malankara Pentecost Daivasabha from AG fellowship. Cook, who was also aware of the future of Pentecostal movement, decided to detach from AG mission and thought of giving more opening to the native ministers for ministry and administration.

The unity between Cook and Abraham did not last longer because Abraham decided to separate from Cook in January 1930. There are two reasons Abraham indicted for the decision behind separation, first, the freedom of local churches and second, the assumption that an apostolic faith life will not be possible by being with Cook. The diplomatic thought of apostolic life was the influence of Pastor Paul who came and preached in South India. Pastor Paul is the founder of Ceylon Pentecostal Mission, which is today known as ‘The Pentecostal Mission’. Some of the believers from Kumbanad tried to unite Rev. Cook and Abraham, but it did not work out.

Abraham accepted the same name that was given to the independent churches in 1924 as ‘Thennindia Pentecosthu Daivasabha’. After the separation from Cook, Pastor P M Samuel joined Thennindia Pentecosthu Daivasabha with the seventeen churches that he had established. The churches also grew in number in the ministry of native ministers. Since Abraham and his colleagues were challenged by the life and faith of Pastor Paul, they also decided to follow "the Apostolic Faith life".

The Thennindia Pentecosthu Daivasabha came in cooperation with the "Ceylon Pentecostal Mission" in 1930 and the fellowship and ministry together existed until 1933, but Abraham had to leave the fellowship due to some doctrinal differences and differences regarding baptism. When Abraham, Alwin and Paul failed to settle the issue after many written discussions, Abraham took a decision to separate from Ceylon Pentecostal Mission in 1933. It was the Ceylon Pentecostal Mission chief Pastor Paul who ordained K E Abraham in 1933 as Pastor. Today Rev. DR. T. Valsom Abraham (grandson of K E Abraham) serves as the General President of IPC ministry. 

The following 8 Pastors were the founders of this organization.
Pastor K C Oommen - (Kodumthara)
Pastor K E Abraham (Kumbanadu)
Pastor K C Cherian (Mazuvali)
Pastor P T Varughese (Chethakkal)
Pastor T G Oommen (Povanmala)
Pastor T K Mathew (Karamvali)
Pastor A C Samuel - Koyipparam (Later went back to AG Church)
Pastor V V Thomas (Ranni)

The era of expansion and renaming (1933-1950)
By 1933 the ministry of Thennindia Pentecosthu Daivasabha expanded outside Kerala state, therefore, the ministers requested the leaders of the church to establish a council. The first minister's council was formed on 5 June 1933. There were 17 members selected in the council and they were: 

 1. P.M. Samuel (President), Faith Home, Thogur, Tanjore Dist. Missionary
 2. K.C. Cherian (V.P.), Faith Home, Kankanady, South Kanara. Missionary
 3. P.T. Chacko B.D. (Secretary), Kumbanad, Travancore, Missionary 
 4. K.E. Abraham, Faith Home, Kumbanad, Travancore Missionary
 5. T. Kochukunju, Faith Home, Trivandrum, Travancore. Missionary
 6. K.C. Oommen, Faith Home, Kumbanad, Travancore. Missionary 
 7. P.T. Mathew Poovathur, Kumbanad, Travancore. Missionary 
 8. V.V. Thomas Faith Home, Ranni West, Travancore. Missionary
 9. P.O. Thomas Salem, Ranni East, Travancore. Missionary
 10. T.G. Oommen Ayroor, Kozhencherry, Travancore. Missionary
 11. P.T. Varghese, Faith Home, Kunnamkulam, Cochin State. Missionary
 12. K. M. Zachariah, Punnakadu, Kozhencherry, Travancore. Missionary
 13. P.M. Thomas B.A., Kalpathi, Palghat, Malabar Gospel Work.Missionary
 14. E.K. John 'Bethel', Kottarakkara, Travancore. Missionary
 15. M. Simon Faith Home, Calicut, Malabar, Missionary
 16. T.V. Issac Kunnamkulam, Cochin State. Teacher
 

P M Samuel was selected as the first president of this independent organisation and the council was registered in Aranmula. The head office of the organisation was in Kumbanad, Kerala. Since the work of the Thennindia Pentecosthu Daivasabha reached far beyond South India, the name was changed to India Pentecosthu Daivasabha (Indian Pentecostal Church of God). The organisation is registered in Eluru, Andhra Pradesh under the Societies Act XXI of 1860 on 9 December 1935.

K E Abraham started a bible school at his house, which was unnamed until 1932 and then given the name  Hebron Bible College. HBC is an institution that has trained more than 14,000 church leaders, pastors, missionaries, evangelists and students belonging to various denominations for over 83 years.

The organisation since 1950s
Thereafter, the IPC made a remarkable progress in founding local churches and taking the gospel to different parts of Kerala as well as other states of India. By 1950, IPC was the leading Pentecostal organisation in South Kerala. However, the period from 1953-1966 was also marked as the period when the church split also referred to as ‘the Dark Age’ of IPC. The split among IPC workers caused many to leave the organisation. The division briefly affected the growth of the church and it is written that K.E. Abraham had contemplated leaving the organisation. After the 1970s the IPC formed a national council for the smooth expansion of the organisation. Today, with more than a 7500 congregations, IPC has founded local churches in all the major continents of the earth. The native leaders’ vision and hard work can be primarily attributed to the growth of the IPC.
In Tamil Nadu and Andhra Pradesh, Pastor P.M. Samuel, Pastor Paramjodhi - Andhra Pradesh, Pastor K.G. Koshy - Chennai and Pastor Abraham Samuel - Andhra Pradesh developed the local churches and ministries and they were able to bring many to Christ and through their work in Andhra and Tamil Nadu there are many thousands that are believers in Christ. As a result of their work, there are large churches that bring in thousands of people to worship each Sunday.

Beliefs

The Statement of Faith is the Indian Pentecostal Church of God's doctrinal standard.

Statement of Faith

Administration and Governing
Indian Pentecostal Church is governed by General Presbytery and General Council.  The general management of the Church are carried by the general council, whereas spiritual administration, doctrines and matters pertaining to church ministers are carried by general presbytery.

Presbytery
IPC has a presbytery in three levels of administration: General, Region or State, and District. The members of the presbytery are ordained ministers. All ordained offices held in IPC are exclusively for men. As per the constitution, the General Presbytery meets when called by the General Secretary on behalf of the General President.  The General Presbytery is the 'Court of Appeal' in all matters of the church and its decision is considered as final. The ministers who form the General Presbytery are:
 The minister executives of the General Council 
 Senior General Ministers
 The presidents, vice presidents and secretaries of the State/Region Councils which has more than 500 local churches 
 The presidents, and secretaries of State/Regions Councils which has 101 to 500 local churches 
 The presidents of State/Region Council that has 100 or less local churches

Matters pertaining to the transfer of a minister, ordination of a minister etc. are decided by the respected Region or State Presbytery on the recommendation of the District Presbytery.

Council
Council consists of both ordained ministers and elders from local churches. All members of a council are men. They are in charge of management of the church, finances, church buildings and assets, conventions and conferences etc. Councils are found in every level of management: General, Region or State, District, and local church. The executive members of the council are the President, Vice-President, Secretary, Joint-Secretary and Treasurer. Ordained ministers are not allowed to hold the post of a treasurer, usually joint-secretary post in General and State Councils are reserved for non ministerial elders, however, there could exist two joint-secretaries, one elected from ministers and one from believers. The executive members are assisted by council members, both ordained ministers and elders. The usual term of a council is 3 years.

 Local Church Council: The management of local church is carried out by the Council of elders elected by the General Body of that local church. The president of the local church is an ordained minister who serves as the pastor of that church. Any member who serves as a pastor of another local church or is in charge of a district cannot be part of the local church council. They can be ordinary members of the church.
 District Council: The president of the district council is reserved for the District Pastor, who is appointed by the State/ Region Presbytery. The local churches of a district will convey to elect members to the district council. District vice-president post is reserved for a senior minister, and a minister will serve as secretary. Joint secretary and treasurer posts are held by believers. The district council must have council members in the ratio of 11 ordained ministers to 10 elders from local churches of that district.
 State Council: State council consists of president (minister), vice-President (minister), secretary (minister), joint-secretary (elder) and treasurer (elder) and council members consisting of ministers and elders from local churches from that State.
 General Council: General council consists of president (minister), vice-President (minister), secretary (minister), joint-secretary (elder) and treasurer (elder) and council members consisting of ministers and elders from local churches.

The president, vice-President, secretary and minister-joint secretary will be part of the Presbytery and will serve in that office in the Presbytery.

Related bodies
There are many auxiliary ministries associated with IPC such as Bible Colleges & schools, Pentecostal Young People Association (PYPA), Fellowship of Women - Indian Pentecostal Women's Association, Sunday School  and Christian publications, magazines and journals. All these auxiliary ministries have contributed to the growth of Pentecost entirely. PYPA is one of the leading auxiliary ministries and a grooming ground for new leaders and preachers for the church. Many talented ministers and believers have emerged and continue to emerge from the folds of PYPA. The Sunday school association also has been carrying a systematic ministry for years. The Sunday School consists of 15 grades and the people that faithfully complete the 15th class are awarded a Diploma in Theology from IPC Sunday School Association.

Kumbanad Convention

The famous Kumbanad convention is an annual Pentecostal convention that is held by the Indian Pentecostal Church of God at Hebronpuram, Kumbanad. It is one of the oldest and the largest Pentecostal conventions in India. First General Convention of IPC was held at Kalakkattu Purayidam near Ittyappara Ranni from Wednesday 1 April to Sunday 5 April 1925. The IPC convention is usually held in January and the 97th Kumbanad Convention was held online from 18th Jan – 24 Jan 2021 due to COVID 19 pandemic and the 98th Kumbanad Convention was held at Hebron ground, Kumbanad from 16 Jan - 23 Jan 2022 in a hybrid mode (virtual media and physical gathering) with limited number of participants in the physical gathering due to covid related restrictions.

External links
Indian Pentecostal Church of God Website
Indian Pentecostal Church of God, Bangalore Website
Indian Pentecostal Church of God and PYPA (United Kingdom and Ireland) Website
Indian Pentecostal Church of God (Canada Website
Indian Pentecostal Church of God, PYPA Kerala, Website
Indian Pentecostal Church of God, Hyderabad PYPA Youth wing Website
Indian Pentecostal Church of God, PYPA Kumbanad Centre Kerala

References

Christian organizations established in 1924
1924 establishments in British India
Pentecostal denominations in Asia
Religious conversion in India
Pentecostal denominations established in the 20th century
Pentecostalism in India
Church of God denominations
Evangelical denominations in Asia